Eugene M. Dahlquist (born December 31, 1942) is an American gridiron  football coach and former player. He is currently the quarterbacks coach of the Winnipeg Blue Bombers of the Canadian Football League (CFL), a position he assumed in February 2014. Dahlquist was the head coach for the Scottish Claymores of NFL Europefrom 2001 to 2003, compiling a record of 15–15. Prior to his professional career, he worked 31 years in the collegiate ranks. Dahlquist served as the offensive coordinator at five different schools: Oregon, Boise State, Iowa State, Illinois, and Texas. He returned to coaching in 2019 with the Pioneros de Querétaro in Mexico, but he left the team after two games citing personal reasons.

Originally from Mount Prospect, Illinois, Dahlquist played quarterback at Arizona and later for the Norfolk Neptunes in the Continental Football League.

Head coaching record

References

External links
 UNLV profile

1942 births
Living people
American football punters
American football quarterbacks
Arizona Wildcats football players
Boise State Broncos football coaches
Continental Football League players
Illinois Fighting Illini football coaches
Omaha Nighthawks coaches
People from Mount Prospect, Illinois
Sportspeople from the Chicago metropolitan area
Players of American football from Illinois
Scottish Claymores coaches
Texas Longhorns football coaches
Utah Utes football coaches
Winnipeg Blue Bombers coaches
American expatriate sportspeople in Mexico